Pablo González Cuesta (Pablo Gonz) is a Spanish writer born in Seville (1968). Until the age of three, he lived in Sao Paulo (Brazil). Later, his family moved to Barcelona and then to Madrid where he remained until 2001. Currently, he resides in Punucapa, close to Valdivia (Chile).

Pablo Gonz obtained a degree in Geography and History from the Universidad Complutense de Madrid in 1991. In that same period date his first steps in literature, being his major literary references: Gabriel García Márquez, Eduardo Mendoza, Leo Tolstoy and Stefan Zweig.

Novels 

1996:	La pasión de Octubre (Alba Editorial, Barcelona).
1997:	Experto en silencios (Bitzoc, Palma de Mallorca, Spain).
1998:	Los hijos de León Armendiaguirre (Planeta, Barcelona).
2008:	Libertad (Uqbar, Santiago de Chile).
2008:	Mío (Carisma, Badajoz, Spain).
2011:	Mío (Bubok, Madrid, Spain)..
2013:	Novela 35 lebensráumica (20:13, Valdivia, Chile).
2014:	Novela 31 (http://www.revistanarrativas.com).
2014:	Lavrenti y el soldado herido (20:13, Valdivia, Chile).

Minifictions 

2010:	La saliva del tigre (20:13, Valdivia, Chile).

Awards 

1995:	V Prensa Canaria Novel Award for La pasión de Octubre.
1997:	V Juan March Cencillo Brief Novel Award for Experto en silencios.
2008:	II Encina de Plata Brief Novel Award for Mío.
2011:	Calaix de Llibres Short Fiction Award for El Manchado.

External links 

Publishing houses:
 http://www.albaeditorial.es
 http://www.editorial.planeta.es
 http://www.uqbareditores.cl
 https://web.archive.org/web/20110720134015/http://www.carismalibros.es/

Articles and news:
 http://dare.uva.nl/document/63721
 http://dialnet.unirioja.es/servlet/articulo?codigo=189408
 http://www.elpais.com/articulo/cultura/Pablo/Gonzalez/Cuesta/gana/premio/Juan/March/novela/breve/elpepicul/19970808elpepicul_7/Tes/
 http://www.hoy.es/20080427/navalmoral/chileno-pablo-gonzalez-gana-20080427.html
 http://violantbcn3.blogspot.com/p/ganadores-del-concurso-de-relatos.html

Blogs:
 http://pablogonz.wordpress.com
 http://pablogonzalezcuesta.blogspot.com

Audiobooks:
 http://www.ivoox.com/novela-35-lebensraumica-pablo-gonz-audios-mp3_rf_2186463_1.html

1968 births
Living people
People from Seville
20th-century Spanish novelists
21st-century Spanish novelists
Spanish male novelists
People from Valdivia Province
Complutense University of Madrid alumni
20th-century Spanish male writers
21st-century Spanish male writers